Bahramabad (also Romanized as Bahrāmābād) is a village in Savalan Rural District, in the Central District of Parsabad County, Ardabil Province, Iran. At the 2006 census, its population was 583, in 134 families.

References 

Towns and villages in Parsabad County